= Aichwaldsee =

Lake in Carinthia, Austria

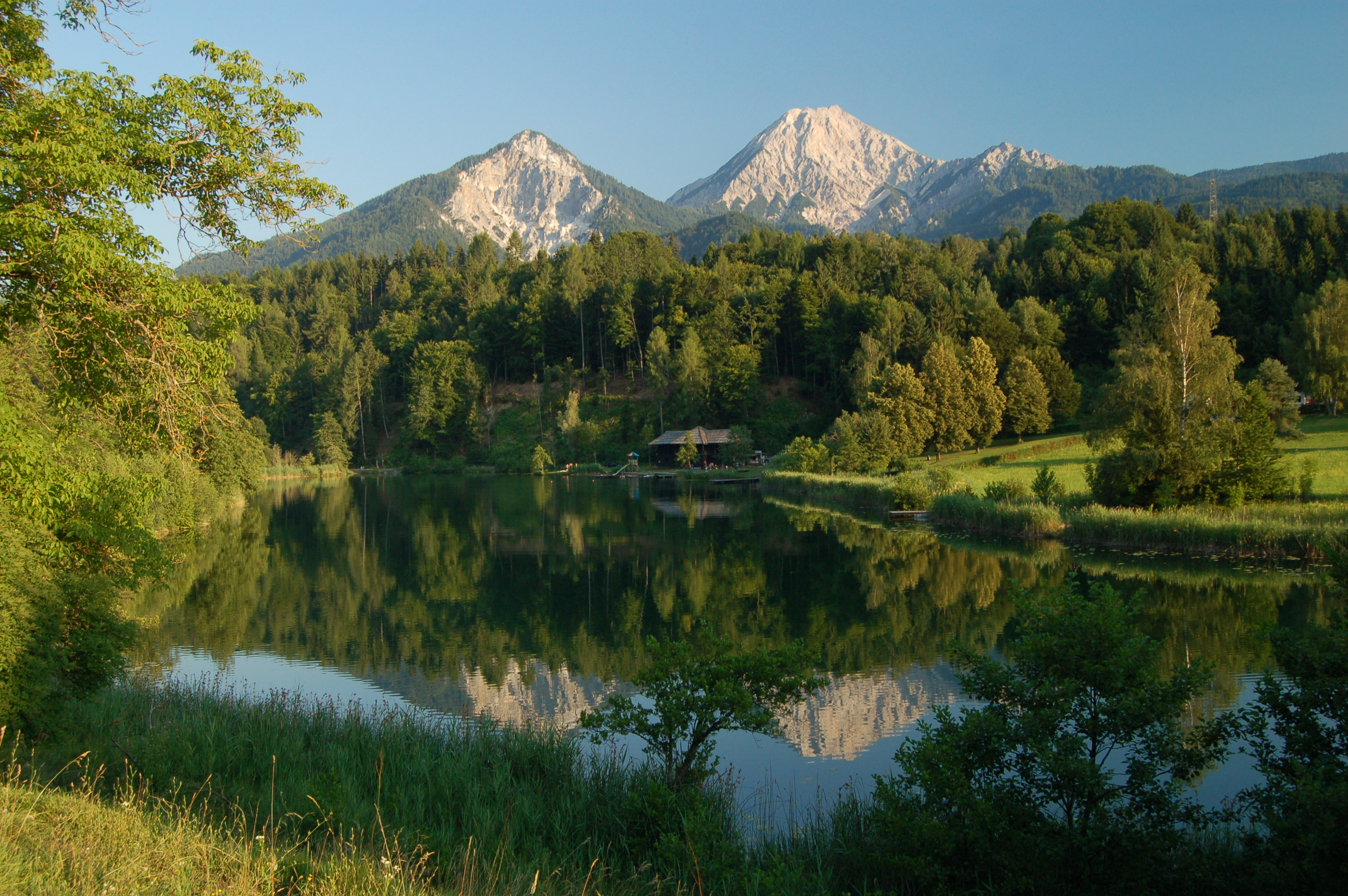
- Aichwaldsee

- Location within Austria
- Location: Carinthia, Austria
- Coordinates: 46.5561°N 13.9445°E
- Type: Lake

Aichwaldsee is a lake of Finkenstein, Carinthia, Austria.
